This is a list of years in Angola. See also the timeline of Angolan history.  For only articles about years in Angola that have been written, see :Category:Years in Angola.

Twenty-first century

Twentieth century

Nineteenth century

See also 
 Timeline of Luanda
 List of years by country

Bibliography
  (Includes chronology)

External links
 

 
Angola history-related lists
Angola